Werte der deutschen Heimat (literally "Values of the German Homeland") originally Werte der Deutschen Heimat and, between 1970 and 1990 called Werte unserer Heimat, was a series of publications by former East German Academy of Sciences at Berlin, that was published by Akademie-Verlag Berlin and included more than 50 volumes.  The work was undertaken by the Academy’s Local History Working Group within the Institute for Geography and Geo-ecology.

The aim of this series was to produce a comprehensive inventory of local history works in East Germany. From 1992 the series continued to be published under its original title of Werte der deutschen Heimat by the Leibniz Institut für Länderkunde (IfL) and, from 1993, by the Verlag Böhlau Nachf. Weimar. In 1994 it was given a new layout and, since 2001, has been continued as Landschaften in Deutschland - Werte der deutschen Heimat. Since Volume 62 the series has been jointly published by the IfL and the Saxon Academy of Sciences at Leipzig (SAW). Since 2001 it has been published by Böhlau Verlag (Cologne, Weimar, Vienna).

Volumes 
 Volume 1: Gebiet Königstein, Sächsische Schweiz, 1957
 Volume 2: Zwischen Sebnitz, Hinterhermsdorf und den Zschirnsteinen, 1959
 Volume 3: Im Süden der Barbarine, 1960
 Volume 4: Um Bad Gottleuba, Berggiesshübel und Liebstadt, 1961
 Volume 5: Das Limbacher Land, 1962
 Volume 6: Das Gleichberggebiet, 1963
 Volume 7: Um Altenberg, Geising und Lauenstein, 1964
 Volume 8: Zwischen Müglitz und Weißeritz, 1964
 Volume 9: Pirna und seine Umgebung, 1966
 Volume 10: Östliches Erzgebirge, 1966
 Volume 11: Die Bergbaulandschaft von Schneeberg und Eibenstock, 1967
 Volume 12: Um Bautzen und Schirgiswalde, 1967
 Volume 13: Von Annaberg bis Oberwiesenthal, 1968
 Volume 14: Greifswald und seine Umgebung, 1968
 Volume 15: Potsdam und seine Umgebung, 1969
 Volume 16: Die südöstliche Oberlausitz mit Zittau und dem Zittauer Gebirge, 1970
 Volume 17: Um Stolpen und Neustadt, 1970
 Volume 18: Weimar und seine Umgebung, 1973
 Volume 19: Magdeburg und seine Umgebung, 1973
 Volume 20: Um Aue, Schwarzenberg und Johanngeorgenstadt, 1972
 Volume 21: Zwischen Tharandter Wald, Freital und dem Lockwitztal, 1973
 Volume 22: Lössnitz und Moritzburger Teichlandschaft, 1973
 Volume 23: Das Altenburger Land, 1973, 2. bearb. Aufl. 1974
 Volume 24: Zwischen Strohmberg, Czorneboh und Kottmar, 1974
 Volume 25: Das Rheinsberg-Fürstenberger Seengebiet, 1974
 Volume 26: Das Obere Vogtland, 1976
 Volume 27: Dresdner Heide, Pillnitz, Radeberger Land, 1976
 Volume 28: Das mittlere Zschopaugebiet, 1977
 Volume 29: Der Kyffhäuser und seine Umgebung, 1976
 Volume 30: Um Oschatz und Riesa, 1977
 Volume 31: Zwischen Zwickauer Mulde und Geyerschem Wald, 1980
 Volume 32: Elbtal und Lößhügelland bei Meißen, 1979
 Volume 33: Karl-Marx-Stadt, 1979
 Volume 34: Um Eberswalde, Chorin und den Werbellin-See, 1981
 Volume 35: Zwischen Mülsengrund, Stollberg und Zwönitztal, 1981
 Volume 36: Burger und Lübbenauer Spreewald, 1981
 Volume 37: Ruppiner Land, 1981
 Volume 38: Mansfelder Land, 1982
 Volume 39: Zwischen Rennsteig und Sonneberg, 1986
 Volume 40: Lausitzer Bergland um Pulsnitz und Bischofswerda, 1983
 Volume 41: Zwischen Wolkenstein, Marienberg und Jöhstadt, 1985
 Volume 42: Dresden, 1984
 Volume 43: Um Olbernhau und Seiffen, 1985
 Volume 44: Plauen und das mittlere Vogtland, 1986
 Volume 45: Eisenhüttenstadt und seine Umgebung, 1986
 Volume 46: Das Gebiet an der unteren Unstrut, 1988
 Volume 47: Freiberger Land, 1988
 Volume 48: Zwischen Ruhla, Bad Liebenstein und Schmalkalden, 1989
 Volume 49/50: Berlin, 1987
 Volume 51: Westliche Oberlausitz zwischen Kamenz und Königswartha, 1990
 Volume 52: Dessau-Wörlitzer Kulturlandschaft, 1992
 Volume 53: Havelland um Werder, Lehnin und Ketzin, 1992
 Volume 54: Görlitz und seine Umgebung, 1994
 Volume 55: Burger und Lübbenauer Spreewald, 1994
 Volume 56: Zwischen Löbau und Herrnhut, 1996
 Volume 57: Das Feldberger Seengebiet, 1997
 Volume 58: Rudolstadt und das mittlere Saaletal, 1998
 Volume 59: Das östliche Vogtland, 1998
 Volume 60: Das Müritzgebiet, 1999
 Volume 61: Weimar und seine Umgebung, 1999
 Volume 62: Saalfeld und das Thüringer Schiefergebirge, 2001, 
 Volume 63: Der Schraden, 2001, 
 Volume 64: Um Eberswalde, Chorin und Werbellinsee, 2002, 
 Volume 65: Das Mittelrheinische Becken, 2003, 
 Volume 66: Bitterfeld und das untere Muldetal, 2004, 
 Volume 67: Oberlausitzer Heide- und Teichlandschaft, 2005, 
 Volume 68: Das nördliche Vogtland um Greiz, 2006, 
 Volume 69: Brandenburg an der Havel und Umgebung, 2006, 
 Volume 70: Großenhainer Pflege, 2008, 
 Volume 71: Fischland, Darß, Zingst und Barth mit Umland, 2010, 
 Volume 72: Eiderstedt, 2010,  (in preparation)

External links 
 Institut für Länderkunde (Schriftenreihe "Landschaften in Deutschland - Werte der Deutschen Heimat")
 Sächsische Akademie der Wissenschaften (Kommission für Landeskunde)
 Böhlau-Verlag (Katalog der Reihe "Landschaften in Deutschland")

East German culture
Series of books